Sit (also Romanized as Sīt) is a village in Senderk Rural District, Senderk District, Minab County, Hormozgan Province, Iran. At the 2006 census, its population was 226, in 55 families.

References 

Populated places in Minab County